William L. Greenly (September 18, 1813November 29, 1883) was a politician from the U.S. state of Michigan, serving as the sixth governor of Michigan.

Early life in New York
Greenly was born in Hamilton, New York. He graduated from Union College of Schenectady, New York in 1831, then studied law with Stower & Gridley in Hamilton and was admitted to the bar at Albany, New York in 1834.

Politics in Michigan
He moved to Adrian, Michigan in October 1836. He served as a member of the Michigan State Senate from the 2nd district from 1839 to 1840, and from the 3rd district from 1842 to 1843.

Greenly served as the fifth lieutenant governor of Michigan from 1846 to 1847 and became governor on March 4, 1847, after the resignation of Alpheus Felch to take a seat in the U.S. Senate. He completed Felch's term through January 3, 1848. Greenly served through much of the Mexican–American War, where troops from Michigan were sent such as Company K, 3d Dragoons, as well as A, E, and G of the U. S. Infantry.

Retirement and death

After his brief time as governor, he served as justice of the peace for twelve years, and was elected mayor of Adrian, Michigan, in 1858, serving only one year.  He died on November 29, 1883, in Adrian at the age of seventy. He is interred at Oakwood Cemetery in Adrian.

Family life
Governor Greenly was married three times. He married Sarah A. Dascomb in Hamilton, New York in December 1834. Following her death, he married Elizabeth W. Hubbard in Northampton, Massachusetts, on June 11, 1840. He and Elizabeth had one son, Marshal. Following Elizabeth's death, he married Maria Hart in Adrian, Michigan, on October 25, 1859

References

Further reading

External links
National Governors Association

1813 births
1883 deaths
Democratic Party governors of Michigan
Lieutenant Governors of Michigan
Mayors of Adrian, Michigan
Democratic Party Michigan state senators
Michigan state court judges
Union College (New York) alumni
Burials in Michigan
People from Hamilton, New York
19th-century American politicians
19th-century American judges